

War of the Pacific

In order to support amphibious operations during the landing in Pisagua by carrying significant quantities of cargo, and landing troops directly onto an unimproved shore, the Government built flat-bottomed landing craft, called Chalanas. They transported 1,200 men in the first landing and took onboard 600 men in less than 2 hours for the second landing.

ASMAR

ASMAR or Astilleros y Maestranzas de la Armada is a Chilean state-owned shipyard service dealing both with military and civilian vessels.

 Cirujano Videla (1964)
 Fuentealba (1966)
 Odger (1966)
 Castor (1968)
 Papudo (1970)
 Maipo (1981)

Asenav

Lever, Murphy & Co.

Located in Caleta de la Barca, (today Caleta Abarca), this shipyard registers works:

 1885, install 4 new boilers in Huáscar (ship) 
 Meteoro (1901) 
 1898 assembled the parts built by Yarrow Shipbuilders of: Contreras (1896), Mutilla (1896), Rodriguez (1896) and Thomson (1896).

Alberto Daiber Shipyard
Located in Valdivia, Chile

 Huemul (1935) 
 Águila (1941)
 Brito (1935)

Behrens Shipyard, Valdivia

 Pisagua (1904) 
 Valdivia (1903)

Duprat Shipyard
1845 in Valparaíso

 Ancud (1853) 
 Constitución (1851) 
 María Susana

Las Habas Shipyard
Located in Valparíso

 Ortiz (1957)

MARCO Chilena
MARCO is a company founded in Iquique, dedicated to construction, repair, and rebuild of steel vessels of up to 95M Length overall. The shipyard also offers consulting and engineering work services.

 Brito (1966)

Oettinger Shipyard
Located in Valdivia

 Isleña (1938)

See also
 Maritime history of Chile

References
 Buques de la Armada construidos en Chile by Germán Bravo Valdivieso

Shipyards of Chile
Shipyards
Shipbuilding companies
Chile
Lists of industrial buildings